My Big Night is a 2015 Spanish comedy film directed by Álex de la Iglesia, who also co-wrote it with Jorge Guerricaechevarría.

Plot
José has been sent by the employment agency as an extra for the taping of a New Year's Eve television special (four months in advance) in an industrial pavilion just outside Madrid, leaving his mother Dolores (an old woman unable to detach herself from a big crucifix she tore from her husband's grave) alone. He is replacing another extra who died in the wake of an accident involving a production crane during a rehearsal. Hundreds of people like him are locked in the set, replaying rehearsal after rehearsal, applauding for musical performances they do not actually see and celebrating the false arrival of the new year. José starts to fall for dinner companion Paloma (a jinxed woman) to the amusement of the rest of extras sharing the table (Antonio, Yanire, and Josua). Meanwhile major clashes of egos are unfolding backstage.

On the one hand, veteran (and ruthless) crooner Alphonso comes face to face with his bitter rival, Latin pop young sensation Adanne as Alphonso is not willing to let anyone else than him to come out at the top. Yuri, Alphonso's presumed adopted son and primary target of his cruelty, has hired an assassin (Óscar) to get rid of Alphonso. A purported fan has managed to get a vial with Adanne's semen so he can be blackmailed. On the other hand, the two co-hosts of the show and an actual disfunctional couple (Roberto and Cristina) cannot stand each other and fight over the trust of the producer Benítez, who is aware the channel is struggling to avoid its closure. Meanwhile a mobile control unit formed by Rosa and Amparo stays aloof trying to save the insane television shoot.

Cast

Production 
A Enrique Cerezo PC and Telefónica Studios production, the film had the participation of TVE and Canal+ and support from ICAA.

Release 
The film's world premiere was at the 40th Toronto International Film Festival in September 2015. Distributed by Universal Pictures, the film was theatrically released in Spain on 23 October 2015.

Accolades

See also 
 List of Spanish films of 2015

References

2015 films
2010s musical comedy films
2010s Spanish-language films
Films directed by Álex de la Iglesia
Films with screenplays by Jorge Guerricaechevarría
Films set around New Year
Spanish musical comedy films
2015 comedy films
2010s Spanish films
Enrique Cerezo PC films